The Spanish Network of Excellence on Cybersecurity Research (RENIC), is a research initiative to promote cybersecurity interests in Spain.

Members

Board of Directors (2018) 
 President: Universidad de Málaga
 Vicepresident: CSIC
 Treasurer: Universidad Politécnica de Madrid
 Secretary: Universidad de Granada
 Vocals: Tecnalia, Universidad de La Laguna and Universidad de Modragón

Board of Directors (2016) 
 President: Universidad Carlos III de Madrid
 Vicepresident: Universidad Politécnica de Madrid
 Treasurer: Universidad de Granada
 Secretary: Universidad de León
 Vocals: Gradiant, Tecnalia, Universidad de Málaga

Founding Members 
 Centro Andaluz de Innovación y Tecnologías de la Información y las Comunicaciones (CITIC).
 Consejo Superior de Investigaciones Científicas (CSIC).
 Centro Tecnolóxico de Telecomunicaciones de Galicia (Gradiant).
 Instituto Imdea Software.
 Instituto Nacional de Ciberseguridad (INCIBE).
 Mondragón Unibertsitatea.
 Tecnalia.
 Universidad Carlos III de Madrid.
 Universidad Castilla la Mancha.
 Universidad de Granada.
 Universidad de la Laguna.
 Universidad de León.
 Universidad de Málaga.
 Universidad de Murcia.
 Universidad de Vigo.
 Universidad Internacional de la Rioja.
 Universidad Politécnica de Madrid.
 Universidad Rey Juan Carlos.

Members 
 Consejo Superior de Investigaciones Científicas (CSIC).
 Centro Tecnolóxico de Telecomunicaciones de Galicia (Gradiant).
 Instituto Imdea Software.
 Instituto Nacional de Ciberseguridad (INCIBE).
 Mondragón Unibertsitatea.
 Tecnalia.
 Universidad Carlos III de Madrid.
 Universidad de Castilla-La Mancha.
 Universidad de Granada.
 Universidad de la Laguna.
 Universidad de León.
 Universidad de Málaga.
 Universidad de Murcia.
 Universidad de Vigo.
 Universidad Politécnica de Madrid.
 Universidad Rey Juan Carlos.
 Universitat Oberta de Catalunya.
 IKERLAN.

Honorary Members 
 Centre for the Development of Industrial Technology (CDTI). (2017)
 Instituto Nacional de Ciberseguridad (INCIBE). (2016)

Initiatives and Participations 
 RENIC is ECSO member, and is also a member of its board of directors.
 A collaboration agreement between RENIC and the Innovative Business Cluster on Cybersecurity (AEI Cybersecurity) has been signed.
 RENIC is pleased to sponsor the Cybersecurity Research National Conferences (JNIC) JNIC2017 edition, organized by Universidad Rey Juan Carlos.
 RENIC is pleased to announce the publication of the online version of the Catalog and knowledge map of cybersecurity research

References 

Computer security
Development